Izatha is a genus of moths of the family Oecophoridae. They are commonly known as lichen tuft moths. This genus is endemic to New Zealand.

Species
attactella-group:
Izatha attactella Walker, 1864
Izatha blepharidota Hoare, 2010
Izatha voluptuosa Hoare, 2010
Izatha austera (Meyrick, 1883)
Izatha psychra (Meyrick, 1883)
mira-group
Izatha copiosella (Walker, 1864)
Izatha walkerae Hoare, 2010
Izatha florida Philpott, 1927
Izatha mira Philpott, 1913
apodoxa-group
Izatha notodoxa Hoare, 2010
Izatha katadiktya Hoare, 2010
Izatha apodoxa (Meyrick, 1888)
Izatha acmonias Philpott, 1921
Izatha lignyarcha Hoare, 2010
Izatha picarella (Walker, 1864)
balanophora-group
Izatha metadelta Meyrick, 1905
Izatha balanophora (Meyrick, 1897)
Izatha churtoni Dugdale, 1988
Izatha dulcior Hoare, 2010
Izatha epiphanes (Meyrick, 1884)
Izatha mesoschista Meyrick, 1931
Izatha haumu Hoare, 2010
Izatha quinquejacula Hoare, 2010
Izatha heroica Philpott, 1926
Izatha hudsoni Dugdale, 1988
Izatha huttonii (Butler, 1879)
Izatha peroneanella (Walker, 1864)
Izatha taingo Hoare, 2010
oleariae-group
Izatha oleariae Dugdale, 1971
Izatha spheniscella Hoare, 2010
Izatha prasophyta (Meyrick, 1884)
caustopa-group
Izatha caustopa (Meyrick, 1892)
Izatha dasydisca Hoare, 2010
Izatha manubriata Meyrick, 1923
convulsella-group
Izatha convulsella (Walker, 1864)
Izatha gekkonella Hoare, 2010
Izatha gibbsi Hoare, 2010
Izatha minimira Hoare, 2010
Izatha rigescens Meyrick, 1929
Izatha phaeoptila (Meyrick, 1905)

References

Moth genera
Moths of New Zealand
Oecophorinae
Endemic fauna of New Zealand
Taxa named by Francis Walker (entomologist)
Endemic moths of New Zealand